Memu Saitham is an Indian Telugu-language reality social television talk show aired on Gemini TV presented by actress and producer Lakshmi Manchu. The show was produced by Manchu Telefilms. The main concept of this show was celebrities lending their hands to the people who are facing turmoil in their lives in order to help them.

Concept
The celebrities who are part of Tollywood turn themselves into the concept of being common men and women among the society in order to help the people who are facing turmoil in their lives. The celebrities help the needy people by earning money through the course of the show and bring confidence to the people by giving them that money.

Overview

Guests included

Season 1

Season 2

Adaptations

References

Indian reality television series
Indian television talk shows
2016 Indian television series debuts
2018 Indian television series endings
2016 Indian television seasons
2018 Indian television seasons
Gemini TV original programming
Telugu-language television shows